Charles-Joseph Loeillard d'Avrigny (c. 1760 in Martinique – 17 September 1823) was a French poet and librettist. He was married to the soprano Rose Renaud.

Works 
1790: Les Brouilleries, opéra comique, composed by Henri-Montan Berton
1793: Eugène ou la Piété filiale, opéra-comique, also composed by Henri-Montan Berton
1794: La Lettre, one-act comedy, in prose and vaudevilles, Paris, Libraire au Théâtre du vaudeville
1807: Le Départ de La Pérouse ou les Navigateurs modernes, poem, Paris, Léopold Collin
1812: Poésies nationales, Paris, Le Normant
1819: Jeanne d'Arc à Rouen, five-act tragady, in verse, Paris, Ladvocat
1846: Une expiation, four-act drama, mingled with song, Bruxelles, J.A. Lelong
 Tableau historique des commencements et des progrès de la puissance britannique dans les Indes.

References 

 Ferdinand Hoefer, Nouvelle biographie universelle, Paris, Didot, 1858, (p. 881).
 Jacques-Alphonse Mahul, Annuaire nécrologique, ou Supplément annuel et continuation de toutes les biographies ou dictionnaires historiques, 4e année, 1823, Paris : Ponthieu, 1824, (p. 14-15) .

External links 
 d'Avrigny on 
 His plays and their presentations on CÉSAR

18th-century French poets
18th-century French male writers
19th-century French poets
18th-century French dramatists and playwrights
19th-century French dramatists and playwrights
French opera librettists
Martiniquais poets
1760s births
1823 deaths
Martiniquais dramatists and playwrights